Split 7inch is a split EP by Dropkick Murphys and The Ducky Boys. It was released in July 1996 on Flat Records, with 2,000 copies on black vinyl and 1,000 copies on green vinyl. This is the first release by both bands. The Dropkick Murphys tracks were later re-released on The Singles Collection, Volume 1.

Track listing

Side A (Dropkick Murphys) 
 "Barroom Hero" (Rick Barton/Ken Casey)
 "Fightstarter Karaoke" (Rick Barton/Ken Casey/Mike McColgan)

Side B (The Ducky Boys) 
 "Cross To Bear" (Mark Lind/Mike Marsden/Jason Messina)
 "Pride" (Mark Lind)

Personnel 
Dropkick Murphys:
Mike McColgan - vocals
Rick Barton - guitar, backup vocals
Ken Casey - bass, backup vocals
Jeff Erna - drums
Joe Delaney - bagpipes on 'Barroom Hero'

The Ducky Boys:
Mike Marsden - guitar, vocals
Mark Lind - bass, vocals
Jason Messina - drums
Mike O'Leary - guitar, vocals

Dropkick Murphys albums
1996 EPs
Split EPs
The Ducky Boys albums